The 2000 UEFA European Under-16 Championship was the 18th edition of UEFA's European Under-16 Football Championship. Israel hosted the championship, during 1–14 May 2000. 16 teams entered the competition, and Portugal defeated the Czech Republic in the final to win the competition for the fourth time.

Squads

Qualifying

Group stage

Group A

Group B

Group C

Group D

Knockout stage

Quarter-finals

Semi-finals

Third place playoff

Final

References

External links
UEFA European U-17 C'ship – uefa.com
RSSSF > UEFA European U-17 Championship > 2000

UEFA
UEFA European Under-17 Championship
International association football competitions hosted by Israel
UEFA European Under-16 Championship
May 2000 sports events in Europe
2000 in youth association football